(born 9 May 1984) is a Polish professional pool player. After reaching the last 16 of the 2012 World Pool-Billiard Association World Nine-ball Championship, Skowerski won the 2012 World Pool Masters, defeating fellow Pole Mateusz Śniegocki in the final 8–6, which was held in Kielce, Poland. Skowerski also reached the final of the 2012 World Cup of Pool, alongside Śniegocki, losing to Team Finland, Petri Makkonen and Mika Immonen 10–8.

Titles
 World Pool Masters (2012)
 European Pool Championship
 Straight Pool (2019)
 Polish Pool Championship
 Straight Pool (2003)
 Nine-Ball (2012)
 Ten-Ball (2009, 2017)

References

External links

Polish pool players
Living people
Polish sportsmen
1984 births